Julio César Bonino Bonino (2 February 1947 – 8 August 2017) was a Roman Catholic bishop.

Ordained to the priesthood in 1974, Bonino served as bishop of the Roman Catholic Diocese of Tacuarembó, Uruguay, from 1989 until his death.

Notes

1947 births
2017 deaths
Bishops appointed by Pope John Paul II
Uruguayan Roman Catholic bishops
Roman Catholic bishops of Tacuarembó